The following radio stations broadcast on FM frequency 93.7 MHz:

Argentina
 Cordial in Rosario, Santa Fe
 Radio María in 9 de Julio, Buenos Aires
 Radio María in Saladillo, Buenos Aires
 Radio María in Marcos Juárez, Córdoba
 LRP785 Sol in Romang, Santa Fe

Australia
 Edge FM in Bega, New South Wales
 2LND in Sydney, New South Wales
 Radio National in Lightning Ridge, New South Wales
 Radio TAB in Toowoomba, Queensland
 5DDD in Adelaide, South Australia
 Ace Radio in Portland, Victoria
 3SUN in Mount Buller, Victoria
 6PER in Perth, Western Australia
 Vision Radio Network in Albany, Western Australia

Brazil
 ZYD 661 in Porto Alegre, Rio Grande do Sul
 ZYD 711 in Florianópolis, Santa Catarina

Belize
My Refuge Christian Radio at Roaring Creek.

Canada (Channel 229)
 CBDJ-FM in Hay River, Northwest Territories
 CBJ-FM in Chicoutimi, Quebec
 CBMI-FM in Baie-Comeau, Quebec
 CBNH-FM in St. Andrew's, Newfoundland and Labrador
 CBNL-FM in Clarenville, Newfoundland and Labrador
 CBON-FM-1 in Kirkland Lake, Ontario
 CBON-FM-22 in Geraldton, Ontario
 CBTP-FM in Penticton, British Columbia
 CBUF-FM-7 in Dawson Creek, British Columbia
 CBV-FM-5 in St-Fabien-de-Panet, Quebec
 CBWO-FM in Nelson House, Manitoba
 CBYU-FM in Alexis Creek, British Columbia
 CFGE-FM in Sherbrooke, Quebec
 CFJW-FM in Chapleau, Ontario
 CHEC-FM in Mistawawsis First Nation, Saskatchewan
 CHYX-FM in Kapuskasing, Ontario
 CIFX-FM in Lewisporte, Newfoundland and Labrador
 CJJR-FM in Vancouver, British Columbia
 CJLT-FM in Medicine Hat, Alberta
 CJNU-FM in Winnipeg, Manitoba
 CKMA-FM in Miramichi City, New Brunswick
 CKOL-FM in Campbellford, Ontario
 CKSB-3-FM in The Pas, Manitoba
 CKUA-FM-1 in Calgary, Alberta
 CKWY-FM in Wainwright, Alberta
 CKYC-FM in Owen Sound, Ontario
 VF2581 in Havre St-Pierre, Quebec

China 
 CNR Business Radio in Yunfu

Greece
 Gnomi FM in Thessaloniki
 Ionian- Rythmos in Parta
 Tamiami Galinki Faniki Radiofonia Samou in Samos

Japan
 CBC Radio in Nagoya, Aichi
 MBC Radio in Akune, Kagoshima

Mexico
XEJP-FM in Mexico City
XHAGT-FM in Aguascalientes, Aguascalientes
XHAX-FM in Oaxaca, Oaxaca
XHCCAT-FM in Canatlán, Durango
XHCPCO-FM in Chetumal, Quintana Roo
XHCUAD-FM in Culiacán, Sinaloa
XHDIS-FM in Ciudad Delicias, Chihuahua
XHENI-FM in Tejerías, Michoacán
XHEORO-FM in Guasave, Sinaloa
XHGAL-FM in Galeana, Nuevo León
XHKL-FM in Xalapa, Veracruz
XHLEN-FM in Palenque, Chiapas
XHMRI-FM in Mérida, Yucatán
XHNVS-FM in Navojoa, Sonora
XHPA-FM in Acapulco, Guerrero
XHPEAP-FM in Agua Prieta, La Concordia, Chiapas
XHSCIK-FM in Reynosa, Tamaulipas
XHTEY-FM in Tepic, Nayarit
XHTLAC-FM in Tlacotalpan, Veracruz
XHZQ-FM in Cunduacán, Tabasco
XHZZZ-FM in Manzanillo, Colima

Nigeria
 Rhythm 93.7 FM Port Harcourt
 Rhythm 93.7 FM Lagos

Philippines
 DYMD in Dumaguete City
 DXFD-FM in Cotabato City

United States (Channel 229)
  in Anchorage, Alaska
  in Horton, Kansas
 KAZY in Cheyenne, Wyoming
 KBEP-LP in Bismarck, North Dakota
  in Brookings, South Dakota
  in Coachella, California
 KCZP-LP in San Diego, California
  in Santa Barbara, California
  in Pittsburgh, Pennsylvania
  in Spokane, Washington
 KHBM-FM in Monticello, Arkansas
  in Fort Smith, Arkansas
  in Minot, North Dakota
  in Marked Tree, Arkansas
 KJZY in Sebastopol, California
 KKDL (FM) in Dilley, Texas
  in Carroll, Iowa
 KKUT in Mount Pleasant, Utah
 KLBB-FM in Lubbock, Texas
  in Austin, Texas
  in Elko, Nevada
 KLSY in Montesano, Washington
 KNOR in Krum, Texas
 KNTK in Firth, Nebraska
  in Bozeman, Montana
 KOYY in Fargo, North Dakota
 KPGF in Sun Valley, Nevada
 KPIO-FM in Pleasanton, Kansas
 KQBT in Houston, Texas
 KQFM in Hermiston, Oregon
 KRAI-FM in Craig, Colorado
 KRLZ in Waldport, Oregon
 KRMK in Las Vegas, New Mexico
  in Tucson, Arizona
  in Salida, Colorado
 KSD in Saint Louis, Missouri
  in Fresno, California
 KSPI-FM in Stillwater, Oklahoma
  in Medford, Oregon
 KTRJ-LP in Winthrop, Washington
  in Kirksville, Missouri
 KTZZ in Conrad, Montana
 KURT in Prineville, Oregon
 KVAR (FM) in Pine Ridge, South Dakota
 KWXW in Kermit, Texas
  in Winner, South Dakota
 KXFS in Rankin, Texas
  in Shreveport, Louisiana
 KXWX in Mohave Valley, Arizona
  in Gallup, New Mexico
 KXXR in Minneapolis, Minnesota
  in Felton, California
 KYEZ in Salina, Kansas
 KYFJ in New Iberia, Louisiana
 KYOD-LP in Odessa, Texas
 KYRV in Roseville, California
  in Sheridan, Wyoming
 KZFX in Ridgecrest, California
 KZYY-LP in Tyler, Texas
 WAAO-FM in Andalusia, Alabama
 WAZR in Woodstock, Virginia
 WBCT in Grand Rapids, Michigan
  in Sheboygan, Wisconsin
 WBGR-FM in Monroe, Wisconsin
 WBLK in Depew, New York
 WBQE in Milbridge, Maine
 WBQO in Darien, Georgia
 WBXE in Baxter, Tennessee
 WCFC-LP in Richmond, Virginia
 WCIP in Clyde, New York
  in Three Lakes, Wisconsin
 WDGG in Ashland, Kentucky
  in Birmingham, Alabama
 WDJD-LP in Elizabethtown, North Carolina
  in Lawrence, Massachusetts
 WEHP in Clinton, Indiana
  in Greenville, South Carolina
  in Miamisburg, Ohio
  in Kingston Springs, Tennessee
  in Walton, Indiana
 WGHF-LP in Superior, Wisconsin
  in Vero Beach, Florida
 WHEL in Naples, Florida
  in Addison, Vermont
 WJBC-FM in Pontiac, Illinois
  in Harrietta, Michigan
 WKEY-FM in Key West, Florida
 WKHF in Lynchburg, Virginia
 WMAA-LP in Moca, Puerto Rico
  in Biloxi, Mississippi
 WNKQ-LP in Kissimmee, Florida
 WNOB in Chesapeake, Virginia
  in Topsail Beach, North Carolina
 WOCS-LP in Orangeburg, South Carolina
 WOEZ in Walterboro, South Carolina
  in Ocala, Florida
  in Lunenburg, Vermont
 WOWA in West Salem, Illinois
 WPEZ in Jeffersonville, Georgia
 WQGR in North Madison, Ohio
 WQIO in Mount Vernon, Ohio
 WQPU-LP in Westbrookville, New York
 WRCL in Frankenmuth, Michigan
 WRGG-LP in Greencastle, Pennsylvania
 WRVG-LP in Georgetown, Kentucky
 WRWT-LP in Syracuse, Indiana
 WSAV-LP in Lorain, Ohio
 WSEU-LP in Lakeland, Florida
  in Lamar, South Carolina
  in Dallas, Pennsylvania
  in Wilmington, Delaware
 WSVJ-LP in Titusville, Florida
 WTKB-FM in Atwood, Tennessee
 WTNM in Courtland, Mississippi
 WXNO-LP in New Orleans, Louisiana
 WYAH-LP in Winchester, Kentucky
  in Scotia, New York
  in Georgetown, South Carolina
  in Hartford, Connecticut
  in San Juan, Puerto Rico
 WZWW in Boalsburg, Pennsylvania

References

Lists of radio stations by frequency